Otene Paora (1870 – 29 December 1930) was a New Zealand Māori leader, Anglican lay reader and land negotiator. He was a son of Paora Kawharu and identified with the Ngāti Whātua iwi. He was born in Reweti, Auckland, New Zealand.

Of 12 candidates, he came tenth.

References

1930 deaths
People from Auckland
New Zealand Māori religious leaders
New Zealand Anglicans
Ngāti Whātua people
Year of birth uncertain
Anglican lay readers